Gregory Gray (born March 23, 1954) is an American politician who served in the Minnesota House of Representatives from district 58B from 1999 to 2003.

References

1954 births
Living people
Lawyers from Minneapolis
Politicians from Minneapolis
Hamline University School of Law alumni
University of Wisconsin–River Falls alumni
Democratic Party members of the Minnesota House of Representatives